Some Enchanted Evening is the second live album by the American hard rock band Blue Öyster Cult, released in September 1978 (see 1978 in music). It is Blue Öyster Cult's best-selling album, having sold two million copies, including over a million in the United States. The album's seven tracks were recorded at various locations in the United States and England.

The album was re-issued on CD in early 2007 on Legacy Recordings and included seven previously unreleased bonus tracks recorded in various locations around the US, along with a DVD entitled Some OTHER Enchanted Evening, which featured a previously unreleased performance videotaped at the Capital Centre in Largo, Maryland on July 14, 1978.

Track listing

Some OTHER Enchanted Evening (DVD)

 Filmed on July 14, 1978 at the Capital Centre, Largo, Maryland

Personnel
Blue Öyster Cult
Eric Bloom – lead vocals on tracks 1-5, 7-9, 11, 13-14, stun guitar, keyboards
Donald "Buck Dharma" Roeser – lead guitar, lead vocals on tracks 6
Allen Lanier – keyboards, guitar, mixing
Joe Bouchard – bass, lead vocals on track 10
Albert Bouchard – drums, guitar, backing vocals

Production
Sandy Pearlman – producer, mixing
Murray Krugman – producer
Corky Stasiak – engineer, mixing
Jay Krugman – engineer
George Geranios – live sound, DVD live mix
Bruce Dickinson – re-issue producer
Vic Anesini – remastering

Charts

Certifications

References

1978 live albums
2007 video albums
Blue Öyster Cult live albums
Live video albums
Albums produced by Murray Krugman
Albums produced by Sandy Pearlman
Columbia Records live albums